

New candidates/Outgoing MPs
Below is a summary for the political parties with parliamentary presence from GE2011.

New candidates
A list containing 72 new candidates contesting in the election for the first time, were reflected on the table. (Candidates running as independents were labeled IND in the party column).

Outgoing MPs
A list containing 15 outgoing MPs, all were from PAP, who was either deceased or stepped down on their constituencies, were reflected in the table.

Pre-nomination day

Nomination day and campaigning events

Political party broadcasts
Since the 1980 General Election, political parties fielding at least six candidates under a recognised party symbol are eligible for air-time. Time allocation is based on the number of candidates fielded.

Broadcast 1–3 September 2015

Broadcast 2–10 September 2015

Election rallies
The Singapore Police Force published a list of sites (The Speakers' Corner at Hong Lim Park would not serve as an "unrestricted area") available for electoral meetings on the nomination day on 1 September, and rallies could be held during the campaigning period (2 to 9 September) between 7am to 10pm.

Unless otherwise stated, all rallies below are held between 7pm to 10pm; an  next to the rally indicate lunchtime rallies that were held between 12pm to 2pm.

References

2015 Singaporean general election
2015